The 2004 1000 km of Spa was the fourth and final round of the 2004 Le Mans Series season, held at the Circuit de Spa-Francorchamps, Belgium.  It was run on September 12, 2004.

Official results

Class winners in bold.  Cars failing to complete 70% of winner's distance marked as Not Classified (NC).

Statistics
 Pole Position - #3 Creation Autosportf - 2:05.964
 Fastest Lap - #88 Audi Sport UK Team Veloqx - 2:06.626
 Average Speed - 167.205 km/h

External links
 World Sports Racing Prototypes - 2004 1000 km of Spa results

S
6 Hours of Spa-Francorchamps
1000km